Joseph Matthew Rothwell (born 11 January 1995) is an English professional footballer who plays as a midfielder for Premier League club AFC Bournemouth.

Club career

Manchester United
Having joined Manchester United's academy at the age of six, Rothwell signed professional terms with the club in the summer of 2013. On 26 July 2011, he scored twice in a 7–0 win over County Tyrone in the Milk Cup. He was named as a substitute for a first-team game against Watford in March 2016.

On 27 January 2015, Rothwell joined Blackpool, then in last place in the Championship, on loan for the remainder of the season. Four days later he was included in a professional matchday squad for the first time, remaining an unused substitute for Blackpool's 1–0 win over Brighton & Hove Albion at Bloomfield Road. A week later he made his debut as Blackpool lost 4–0 away to Norwich City, replacing Mark Waddington at half time. His first career start came on 24 February, playing the entirety of a defeat by the same score at Brentford, his last of three appearances for the club.

On 18 July 2015, Rothwell joined League One side Barnsley on a six-month loan. He played four League games (two as a substitute) and made one appearance in the opening round of the Football League Trophy, a competition Barnsley ultimately won, beating Oxford United.

Oxford United
On 12 July 2016, Rothwell joined Oxford on a two-year deal after turning down the offer of a new contract at Manchester United. He scored the first senior goal of his career in an FA Cup second-round replay against Macclesfield Town on 13 December 2016, a game which Oxford won 3–0. His first league goal came in a 5–1 win over Bury on 28 March 2017.

Blackburn Rovers
On 22 June 2018, Rothwell joined Blackburn Rovers for an undisclosed fee. He signed a three-year deal.

At the end of the 2021–22 season it was announced that Rothwell would be leaving the club upon the expiration of his contract.

AFC Bournemouth
On 25 June 2022, Rothwell joined Premier League club AFC Bournemouth on a free transfer, signing a four-year contract.

International career
Rothwell has represented England at under-16, under-17, under-19, and under-20 levels.

Career statistics

Honours
Oxford United
EFL Trophy runner-up: 2016–17

References

External links
Profile at the AFC Bournemouth website

1995 births
Living people
Footballers from Manchester
English footballers
England youth international footballers
Association football midfielders
Manchester United F.C. players
Blackpool F.C. players
Barnsley F.C. players
Oxford United F.C. players
Blackburn Rovers F.C. players
AFC Bournemouth players
English Football League players